The Church Hill North Historic District is a historic district in Richmond, Virginia, that was listed on the National Register of Historic Places in 1997.  An expansion of the district was listed in 2000.  This added  to the original 

The original listing included 587 contributing buildings; 265 more were added in the expansion.
The original included the 1854 Leigh Street Baptist Church by architects Samuel Sloan with cast iron stairs by Asa Snyder and the 1938 Art Deco style East End Theater by Henry Carl Messerschmidt (1891-1994).  Venable Street Baptist Church built by T. Wiley Davis in the 1880s was part of the added area.  The added area also included the Venable Street Baptist Church built in 1891, designed by M. J. Dimmock, the Dean of Richmond Architecture and built by D. Wiley Davis and a hip-roofed Sunday school church addition to East End Baptist Church added by Herbert Levi Cain in 1919.

Gallery

References

Historic districts on the National Register of Historic Places in Virginia
Greek Revival architecture in Virginia
Italianate architecture in Virginia
National Register of Historic Places in Richmond, Virginia
Victorian architecture in Virginia
Buildings and structures in Richmond, Virginia